Knema steenisii is a species of plant in the family Myristicaceae. It is a tree endemic to Flores in Indonesia.

References

steenisii
Flora of the Lesser Sunda Islands
Vulnerable plants
Taxonomy articles created by Polbot